The George Lawshe well house is a building located in Jerome, Idaho, United States, listed on the National Register of Historic Places.

This small building constructed of lava rock was built to shelter the pumping mechanism for a windmill belonging to George Lawshe and his family. The windmill provided water for the house and farm buildings.

See also
 List of National Historic Landmarks in Idaho
 National Register of Historic Places listings in Jerome County, Idaho

References

1920 establishments in Idaho
Agricultural buildings and structures on the National Register of Historic Places in Idaho
Buildings and structures in Jerome County, Idaho
Infrastructure completed in 1920
National Register of Historic Places in Jerome County, Idaho